The 1906 Grant football team was an American football team that represented the Chattanooga campus of  U. S. Grant Memorial University (now known as the University of Tennessee at Chattanooga) during the 1906 college football season. In its first and only year under head coach Arthur Rieber, the team compiled a 3–3 record.

Schedule

References

Grant
Chattanooga Mocs football seasons
Grant football